Clube Desportivo Cova da Piedade is a football club established in the parish of Cova da Piedade, municipality of Almada, Portugal.

History
Clube Desportivo Cova da Piedade was founded on 28 January 1947, resulting from the merge between União Piedense Futebol Clube, founded on 9 April 1914, and Sporting Clube Piedense. Cova da Piedade's current president is Paulo Veiga.

Promotion to LigaPro
On 30 April 2016, Cova da Piedade were promoted for the first time ever to the professional second-tier (all previous presences in the second-tier were prior to the creation of Segunda Divisão de Honra in 1990) after beating Angrense 2–1, confirming the first place on Campeonato de Portugal, South Zone, with two more matches still to play. They won the third-tier championship title on 5 June 2016, against North Zone winners Vizela.

Stadium
Cova da Piedade play their matches at Estádio Municipal José Martins Vieira (named after the former President of the Municipality of Almada) and has a capacity for 3,000 spectators. The stadium has natural turf.

Current squad

Honours
Campeonato de Portugal: 1
2015–16
Terceira Divisão: 2
1947–48, 1970–71

League and cup history

References

External links
 Cova da Piedade at zerozero 

Football clubs in Portugal
Liga Portugal 2 clubs